Symphyotrichum parviflorum (formerly Symphyotrichum subulatum var. parviflorum) is an annual and herbaceous plant commonly known as southwestern annual saltmarsh aster. It is native to Mexico, the Caribbean, most of Central America, Ecuador, and the southwestern United States. It is also known by the scientific name Symphyotrichum expansum.

Description

Southwestern annual saltmarsh aster usually flowers from July through November, but sometimes into January. It has white, sometimes pink, ray florets surrounding yellow disk florets. As the plant is drying after pollination, each ray floret curls into 1 to 2 coils.

Taxonomy
The basionym of Symphyotrichum parviflorum is Aster parviflorus, and it was first described by Christian Gottfried Daniel Nees von Esenbeck ("Nees") in 1818. It also has been called Symphyotrichum expansum with the basionym Erigeron expansus and Symphyotrichum subulatum var. parviflorum.

Distribution and habitat
Symphyotrichum parviflorum is native to Mexico, the Caribbean, most of Central America, Ecuador, and the southwestern United States. It is an introduced species in central Europe. Flora of North America reports an introduction of the species in Hawaii and Japan.

Conservation
, NatureServe gives no global status rank to this plant. It does rank it as Critically Imperiled in Nevada.

Citations

References

expansum
Flora of the Caribbean
Flora of Central America
Flora of Ecuador
Flora of Mexico
Flora of the Southwestern United States
Flora of the South-Central United States
Flora of Alabama
Flora of Florida
Flora of Oklahoma
Plants described in 1818
Taxa named by Christian Gottfried Daniel Nees von Esenbeck